Ika-5 Utos (pronounced as Ika-limang Utos / international title: Revenge / ) is a Philippine television drama crime series broadcast by GMA Network. Directed by Laurice Guillen, it stars Jean Garcia, Valerie Concepcion and Gelli de Belen. It premiered on September 10, 2018 on the network's Afternoon Prime and Sabado Star Power sa Hapon line up replacing Contessa. The series concluded on February 8, 2019 with a total of 116 episodes. It was replaced by Inagaw na Bituin in its timeslot.

The series is streaming online on YouTube.

Premise
Eloisa had a perfect life due to her successful and loving husband, two nice kids and helpful friends. However Eloisa didn't expect that her friend Clarisse will destroy her peaceful life. When everything is almost gone, Eloisa runs to Kelly to start again. Years after, Eloisa is still hunted by Clarisse's sin.

Cast and characters

Lead cast
 Jean Garcia as Eloisa Vallejo-Buenaventura
 Valerie Concepcion as Clarisse Alfonso-Buenaventura / Cynthia Alfonso
 Gelli de Belen as Kelly San Diego-Manupil

Supporting cast
 Jeric Gonzales as Brix Lorenzo
 Tonton Gutierrez as Emilio "Emil" Buenaventura Sr.
 Migo Adecer as Francis "Frank" Buenaventura
 Klea Pineda as Candy Buenaventura
 Jake Vargas as Carlo Manupil
 Inah de Belen as Joanna Alfonso
 Antonio Aquitania as Benjie Manupil

Recurring cast
 Rez Cortez as Dado Vallejo
 Tanya Gomez as Marina Vallejo
 Louella Cordova as Sonia Alfonso
 Gigi dela Riva as Carmelle San Diego
 Ollie Espino as Mando
 Dea Formilleza as Eya
 Yasser Marta as Macky
 Kevin Sagra as Jepoy
 Prince Clemente as Rey
 Faith da Silva as Denise
 Princess Guevarra as Lisa
 Crisanta Mariano as Citadel

Guest cast
 Neil Ryan Sese as Randy Lorenzo
 Kiko Estrada as Emilio "Leo" Buenaventura Jr.
 Marco Alcaraz as Richard Dela Fuenta
 Kiel Rodriguez as Anton
 Kelvin Miranda as Zach
 Ralf King as David
 Ralph Noriega as Paul
 Divine Tetay as Ludwig
 Kim Rodriguez as Roxanne 
 Franchesca Salcedo as Lara
 Lovely Abella as Emily
 Sheena Halili as Millet
 Kevin Santos as Dennis

Ratings
According to AGB Nielsen Philippines' Nationwide Urban Television Audience Measurement People in television homes, the pilot episode of Ika-5 Utos earned a 5.7% rating.

References

External links
 
 

2018 Philippine television series debuts
2019 Philippine television series endings
Filipino-language television shows
GMA Network drama series
Murder in television
Philippine crime television series
Television shows set in the Philippines